John Geoffrey Henry Hudson, (born 7 May 1962) FBA, FRSE, FRHistS is an English medieval historian and Latin translator. He is Professor of Legal History at the University of St Andrews and the William W. Cook Global Law Professor at the University of Michigan Law School.

Hudson specializes in Medieval (particularly Anglo-Norman) legal history, and is known for his monographs on the subject as well as his edition, translation and commentary of the Historia Ecclesie Abbendonensis. In 2006, he gave the Selden Society lecture to mark the centenary of F.W. Maitland's passing. In addition to scholarly books, chapters, articles and lectures, Hudson has also contributed to The Times Literary Supplement. He was educated at Worcester College, Oxford (M.A. and D.Phil.) and the University of Toronto (M.A.).

He was elected a Fellow of the Royal Society of Edinburgh in 2014. In 2016, Hudson was elected to the British Academy.

Books 
 Land, Law, and Lordship in Anglo-Norman England (Oxford, 1994)
 The Formation of the English Common Law (London, 1996)
 "Pollock and Maitland": Centenary Essays on the "History of English Law" (Proceedings of the British Academy (89; 1996) (Hudson was editor)
 The History of the Church of Abingdon, 2 vols, (Oxford, 2002 and 2007)
 F. W. Maitland and the Englishness of English Law (Selden Society Lecture for 2006:published 2008)
 The Oxford History of the Laws of England Volume II 871-1216 (Oxford, 2012)

In popular culture
In a 2006 poll by BBC History magazine for "worst Briton" of the previous millennium, Hudson's nominee for worst Briton of the 12th century, the murdered Archbishop of Canterbury Saint Thomas Becket, came second behind Jack the Ripper. The poll was dismissed as "daft" in The Guardian, and the result disputed by Anglicans and Catholics. Historians had nominated one person per century, and for the 12th century John Hudson chose Becket for being "greedy", "hypocritical", "founder of gesture politics" and "master of the soundbite". The BBC website also quoted Hudson as saying "Those who share my prejudice against Becket may consider his assassination ... a fittingly grisly end." The BBC History  magazine editor suggested most other nominees were too obscure for voters.

Citations

References
 

Academics of the University of St Andrews
British medievalists
English historians
Living people
University of Michigan faculty
University of Michigan Law School faculty
English male non-fiction writers
Fellows of the British Academy
Fellows of the Royal Historical Society
Fellows of the Royal Society of Edinburgh
Legal historians
Alumni of Worcester College, Oxford
University of Toronto alumni
1962 births